The Sombrero ameiva (Pholidoscelis corvinus) is a lizard species in the genus Ameiva. It is endemic to Sombrero, a small, uninhabited island in the Lesser Antilles under the jurisdiction of Anguilla.

Description
Adults are melanistic, appearing plain brown to slate black, with a dark green to black ventral surface mottled with light blue. Its tail is sometimes spotted green. Males have brown flecks on the dorsal surface and browner heads. Males grow to 133 mm snout-to-vent length, with females being considerably smaller.

It is superficially similar in coloration and scalation to Pholidoscelis atratus and Pholidoscelis corax, two other melanistic species also found on small, barren islands in the Caribbean. As both islands have similar habitats, this is likely the result of independent adaptation.

Its diet includes the eggs of ground-nesting birds.

Conservation
A 1999 study estimated between 396 and 461 individuals, including adults and juveniles, based on mark-recapture data. Although there are no permanent human settlements on Sombrero, increased rodent populations such as introduced mice may put pressure on the lizards. Flooding and sea level rise may also threaten the species. The population appears to be thriving, possibly due to its isolation from human activity.

References

Pholidoscelis
Reptiles described in 1861
Lizards of the Caribbean
Reptiles of Anguilla
Endemic fauna of Anguilla
Taxa named by Edward Drinker Cope